Sead Marušić (born 15 December 1965) is a Croatian rower. He competed at the 1988 Summer Olympics, 1992 Summer Olympics and the 1996 Summer Olympics.

References

1965 births
Living people
Croatian male rowers
Olympic rowers of Yugoslavia
Olympic rowers of Croatia
Rowers at the 1988 Summer Olympics
Rowers at the 1992 Summer Olympics
Rowers at the 1996 Summer Olympics
Rowers from Split, Croatia